Boyero is an unincorporated community in Lincoln County, Colorado, United States. The U.S. Post Office at Hugo (ZIP Code 80821) now serves Boyero postal addresses.

A post office called Boyero was established in 1902, and remained in operation until 1973. The community was named for the local cattle industry, "Boyero" meaning "bull pen" in Spanish.

Geography
Boyero is located at  (38.936446,-103.274746).

See also

Outline of Colorado
Index of Colorado-related articles
State of Colorado
Colorado cities and towns
Colorado counties
Lincoln County, Colorado

References

Unincorporated communities in Lincoln County, Colorado
Unincorporated communities in Colorado